Ellsworth Manuel (born 27 November 1968) is a retired Dutch Antillean long jumper.

Manuel won the bronze medal at the 1995 Central American and Caribbean Championships. He also competed at the 1995 World Championships, the 1996 Olympic Games and the 1997 World Indoor Championships, without reaching the final.

His personal best jump was 7.80 metres.

References

1968 births
Living people
Dutch Antillean long jumpers
Athletes (track and field) at the 1996 Summer Olympics
Olympic athletes of the Netherlands Antilles
World Athletics Championships athletes for the Netherlands Antilles
Male long jumpers
Dutch Antillean male athletes